Our Republic, Hail! was the national anthem of the People's Republic of Bulgaria from 1947 until 1951.

The anthem was in use between one year after the Bulgarian kingdom or republic referendum in 1946 and the affirmation of a new anthem in 1951.

The anthem was obtained through a contest that was announced on 14 February 1947.

Other anthems 

During this period, in the current proposal of the establishment of a Southern Balkan federation, the song "Hey, Slavs" is usually played after the anthem. It was considered as an unofficial national anthem during that period. After the proposed federation failed in June 1948, the song became unpopular.

Lyrics

References 

Bulgarian patriotic songs
European anthems
National symbols of Bulgaria